The 41st Moscow International Film Festival was held from 18 April to 25 April 2019.

Russian film director Nikita Mikhalkov was the president of the festival.
South Korean film director Kim Ki-Duk was head of the main jury.
The Emperor of Paris was the opening film and Meeting Gorbachev was the closing film.
The opening ceremony took place at the Rossiya theatre, hosted by actress Elizaveta Boyarskaya.
The closing ceremony took place at the Rossiya cinema, hosted by actress Marina Alexandrova.
The Golden Saint George for best picture was awarded to the Kazakh film The Secret of a Leader directed by Farkhat Sharipov.

Jury
Main Competition 
 Kim Ki-Duk, film director (South Korea) – President of the Jury
 Semih Kaplanoglu, film director & producer (Turkey)
 Valia Santella, film director & screenwriter (Italy)
 Maria Jävenhelmi, film actress (Finland)
 Irina Apeksimova, film actress (Russia)

Documentary Competition 
 Kevin Simm, film director (UK) – President of the Jury
 Boris Karadzhev, film director (Russia)
 Gulbara Tolomushova, film historian (Kyrgyzstan)

Short film competition  
 Alisa Khazanova, film actress and director (Russia) - Chairman of the Jury
 Heidi Zwicker, Sundance festival programmer (U.S.)
 Ognjen Glavonic, film director (Serbia)

Films in competition
Main Competition

Documentary Competition

Awards 
 Golden Saint George for Best Film: The Secret of a Leader by Farkhat Sharipov, Kazakhstan
 Silver Saint George Special Jury Prize: In Search of Echo (Háiyáng dòngwù) by Zhang Chi, China
 Silver Saint George for Best Director: Valerio Mastandrea, Laughing, Italy
 Silver Saint George for Best Actor: Tommi Korpela, Void, Finland
 Silver Saint George for Best Actress: Soha Niasti, My Second Year in College, Iran
 Silver Saint George for Best Documentary: Men's Room (For Vi Er Gutta) by Petter Sommer & Jo Vemund Svendsen, Norway
 Silver Saint George for Best Short Film: Tiger (Tigre) by Delphine Deloget, France
 FIPRESCI jury prize: Lune de Miel (My Polish Honeymoon) by Elise Otsenberger, France
 NETPAC jury prize: Min Urduber Kyun Khahan Da Kiirbet (The Sun Above Me Never Sets) by Lybov Borisova, Russia
 The Russian film critics' awards
 Jam, by SABU, Japan
 Tyhjiö (Void), by Aleksi Salmenperä, Finland,
 Shonibar Bikel (Saturday Afternoon), by Mostofa Sarwar Farooki, Bangladesh
 To Plant a Flag, by Bobbie Peers, Norway (short film)
 Russian Cinema Club club federation awards
 Tēvs Nakts (The Mover), by Dāvis Sīmanis, Latvia, Germany
 Core of the World, by Natalya Mechshaninova, (Russian program)
 Voskreseniye (Sunday), by Svetlana Proskurina, Russia (diploma)
 Audience Award: Min Urduber Kyun Khahan Da Kiirbet (The Sun Above Me Never Sets) by Lybov Borisova, Russia
 'Kommersant Weekend' weekly's prize: Shonibar Bikel (Saturday Afternoon), by Mostofa Sarwar Farooki, Bangladesh
 Audience Award from the festival's official online cinema, OKKO: In Search of Greatness, by Gabe Polsky, U.S.
 Honorary prize for outstanding contribution in the world cinema: Kim Ki-duk (South Korea)
 Special Prize for the outstanding achievement in the career of acting and devotion to the principles of K. Stanislavsky's school: Ralph Fiennes
Sources:

References

External links
Moscow International Film Festival: 2019 at Internet Movie Database
Moscow Film Festival: 2019 at Moscow Film Festival

2019
2019 film festivals
2019 in Moscow
April 2019 events in Russia